The 2021–22 Northeast Conference men's basketball season began with practices in October 2021, followed by the start of the 2021–22 NCAA Division I men's basketball season in November. Conference play started in January and ended in February 2022.

The NEC tournament was held in March with the higher-seeded team hosting each game.

Changes from last season
On March 5, 2021, it was announced that Central Connecticut head coach Donyell Marshall, was stepping down after five years with the Blue Devils. On May 14, Central Connecticut hired Fairfield assistant coach Patrick Sellers as his replacement.

Head coaches 

Notes: 
 All records, appearances, titles, etc. are from time with current school only. 
 Year at school includes 2021–22 season.
 Overall and NEC/NCAA records are from time at current school and are before the beginning of the 2021–22 season. Because the current LIU athletic program inherited the athletic history of LIU Brooklyn, Kellogg's record includes his two seasons at LIU Brooklyn before the LIU athletic merger.
 Previous jobs are head coaching jobs unless otherwise noted.

Preseason

Preseason coaches poll 

() first place votes

Preseason All-NEC team

NEC regular season

Player of the week
Throughout the regular season, the Northeast Conference offices named player(s) of the week and rookie(s) of the week.

Against other conferences
Records against non-conference foes for the 2021–22 season. Records shown for regular season only.

Conference matrix
This table summarizes the head-to-head results between teams in conference play.

All-NEC honors and awards
At the conclusion of the regular season, the conference selects outstanding performers based on a poll of league coaches, below are the results.

Postseason

NEC tournament

 2022 Northeast Conference Men's Basketball Tournament, held at higher seed campus sites

* denotes overtime period.

NCAA tournament

See also
2021–22 Northeast Conference women's basketball season

References

External links
NEC website